Yinkanie is a locality in the Murray Mallee region of South Australia.

Yinkanie was the terminus of the Moorook railway line which opened in 1925 and closed in 1971. The railway was never extended further north.

References

Towns in South Australia